The Avro Lancaster is a British four-engine heavy bomber used by the Royal Air Force and other Commonwealth air forces during World War II. Of the 7,377 aircraft built, 3,736 were lost during the War (3,249 in action and 487 in ground accidents). Today 17 remain in complete form: two are airworthy, and two others are in taxiable condition with working engines.  Of the surviving airframes, eight are in Canada. Only four of the surviving 17 – KB839, KB882, R5868, and W4783 – flew operational sorties over Continental Europe during the War.

Surviving aircraft

Surviving aircraft by manufacturer

Surviving aircraft

Known wrecks 
In addition to the 17 complete surviving planes, there are a small number of known complete or near-complete Lancaster wrecks.

References
Notes

Bibliography

External Links 
 Lincolnshire Aviation Heritage Centre update page for the restoration of NX611 Just Jane
 Bomber Command Museum of Canada Museum walk-through with Avro Lancaster FM159

Avro Lancaster
Survivors